Mont Carmel is a Canadian unincorporated area in Prince County, Prince Edward Island. The community is located in the "Evangeline Region" which is a cluster of Acadian communities in the central part of Prince County. The village is home to the Notre-dame-du-Mont-Carmel, a massive 450000-brick Catholic church built in 1898.

See also 
List of communities in Prince Edward Island

References 

Communities in Prince County, Prince Edward Island